Blindheim, traditionally known in English as Blenheim, is a village and a municipality in the Bavarian district of Dillingen in southern Germany. It is north of Augsburg, on the left bank of the Danube River. 

The municipality consists of four villages (Blindheim, Unterglauheim, Wolpertstetten and Berghausen). Its population is roughly 1,700. For administrative purposes, it is affiliated with the municipal association of Höchstädt an der Donau.

Since about 1700 the Lordship of Blindheim in the Electorate of Bavaria has been held by the Counts of Rechberg.

On 13 August 1704 the Battle of Blenheim was fought in the vicinity, having decisive importance on the War of Spanish Succession. Blenheim Palace in England was named in memory of the battle, and thus ultimately after Blindheim.

In June 1800, the armies of the French First Republic, under command of Jean Victor Moreau, fought Habsburg regulars and Württemberg contingents, under the general command of Pál Kray. At this battle, the culmination of the Danube Campaign of 1800, Moreau forced Kray to abandon Ulm and withdraw into eastern Bavaria.

See also
 Blenheim Palace
 Blenheim, New Zealand

References

External links
 Official website of the Municipality of Blindheim 
 Google Earth view of Blindheim and around

Dillingen (district)